Datuk Khoo Soo Seang is a Malaysian politician of the Malaysian Chinese Association (MCA), a major party in Malaysia's previous governing Barisan Nasional (BN) coalition.

Politic career
Khoo was the Member of Parliament for Tebrau constituency, in Johor for one term from 2013 to 2018.

Khoo was elected during the 2013 general elections, when he defeated People's Justice Party (PKR) candidate Choong Shiau Yoon with a majority of 1,767 votes. Khoo earned 39,985 votes compared to his opponent with only 38,218 votes.

In the 2018 general elections, Khoo do not seek re-election for the Tebrau constituency which was contested by MCA's vice-president Dr. Hou Kok Chung instead as BN candidate.

Election results

Honours
  :
  Member of the Order of the Defender of the Realm (AMN) (2005)
  Commander of the Order of Meritorious Service (PJN) – Datuk (2017)

References

Khoo Soo Seang
Members of the Dewan Negara
Members of the Dewan Rakyat
Members of the Order of the Defender of the Realm
Commanders of the Order of Meritorious Service
Living people
Place of birth missing (living people)
People from Johor Bahru
1945 births
21st-century Malaysian politicians
Malaysian politicians of Chinese descent